Limelight is a 1952 American comedy-drama film written, produced, directed by, and starring Charlie Chaplin, based on a novella by Chaplin titled Footlights. The score was composed by Chaplin and arranged by Ray Rasch.

The film stars Chaplin as a washed-up comedian who saves a suicidal dancer, played by Claire Bloom, from killing herself, and both try to get through life; additional roles are provided by Nigel Bruce, Sydney Earl Chaplin, Wheeler Dryden, and Norman Lloyd, with an appearance from Buster Keaton. In dance scenes, Bloom is doubled by Melissa Hayden.

Upon the film's release, critics' reception was divided; it was heavily boycotted in the United States because of Chaplin's alleged communist sympathies, and failed commercially. However, the film was re-released in the United States in 1972, which included its first screening in Los Angeles. This allowed the decades-old film to be in contention for the 45th Academy Awards where Chaplin won his only competitive Oscar. Today, the film is sometimes regarded as one of Chaplin's best and most personal works, and has attained a cult following.

Plot 

The movie is set in London in 1914, on the eve of World War I, and the year Chaplin made his first film. Calvero (Charlie Chaplin), once a famous stage clown, but now a washed-up drunk, saves a young dancer, Thereza "Terry" Ambrose (Claire Bloom), from a suicide attempt. Nursing her back to health, Calvero helps Terry regain her self-esteem and resume her dancing career. In doing so, he regains his own self-confidence, but an attempt to make a comeback is met with failure. Terry says she wants to marry Calvero despite their age difference; however, she has befriended Neville (Sydney Earl Chaplin), a young composer who Calvero believes would be better suited to her. In order to give them a chance, Calvero leaves home and becomes a street entertainer. Terry, now starring in her own show, eventually finds Calvero and persuades him to return to the stage for a benefit concert. Reunited with an old partner (Buster Keaton), Calvero gives a triumphant comeback performance. He suffers a heart attack during a routine, however, and dies in the wings while watching Terry, the second act on the bill, dance on stage.

Cast

Production 

Although the film is set in London, it was entirely filmed in the Hollywood area, mostly at the Chaplin Studios. The street where Calvero lives was a redressed set at Paramount Studios, the music hall scenes were filmed at RKO-Pathé studios, and some exterior scenes use back-projected footage of London. Filming took 55 days. Chaplin prominently featured members of his family in the film, including five of his children and his half-brother Wheeler Dryden. Chaplin chose stage actress Claire Bloom for the role of Terry, her first major film role. Chaplin told his older sons he expected Limelight to be his last film. By all accounts, he was very happy and energized during production, a fact often attributed to the joy of recreating his early career in the music hall. Chaplin biographers have assumed that his character in the film was based on his father, Charles Chaplin Sr., who had also lost his audience and became an alcoholic, which led to his death in 1901. In both his 1964 autobiography and his 1974 book, My Life in Pictures, however, Chaplin insists that Calvero is based on the life of stage actor Frank Tinney. Limelight was made during a time where Chaplin was starting to lose his audience, too; in many ways, the movie was highly autobiographical.

The pairing of Chaplin and Buster Keaton in the final musical number is historic for being the only time the two performed together on film. Chaplin, at first, had not written the part for Keaton, because he believed that the role was too small. It was not until he learned that Keaton was going through hard times that Chaplin insisted Keaton be cast in the film: Before Limelight, Keaton had gone through a disastrous marriage, lost most of his fortune in the divorce process, and had appeared infrequently in films in the preceding years. A rumor has persisted, fueled by the intense rivalry among fans of the two comics, that Keaton gave such a superior performance that Chaplin jealously cut his scenes so he would not be upstaged by his rival. A close associate of Chaplin claimed that Chaplin not only did not feel threatened by Keaton's performance, but also heavily edited his own footage of the duet while enhancing Keaton's. According to Keaton's biographer Rudi Blesh, Chaplin eased his notoriously rigid directorial style to give Keaton free rein to invent his own comic business during this sequence. Keaton's widow Eleanor said that he was thrilled with his appearance in the film, and believed that his business partner, Raymond Rohauer, started and fueled the rumors. Chaplin's son, Sydney, who also appeared in the film, said that even if some of Keaton's best scenes were cut, which he did not believe, the storyline would not logically allow a supporting actor to suddenly appear and upstage the climactic comeback of Chaplin's character.

While filming was underway, Chaplin's friend and former publicist Harry Crocker invited a large number of reporters to the set to watch the actors work.

Release 
The film opened October 23, 1952 at the Astor Theatre and at the Trans-Lux 60th Street theatre in New York City and was shown for three months to good business.

Contemporary reviews found much to admire in the film, but commonly faulted it as excessively long and verbose. Bosley Crowther of The New York Times called it "a brilliant weaving of comic and tragic strands, eloquent, tearful and beguiling with supreme virtuosity," though he conceded, "One tangible weakness of the film is the garrulous discussion of human foibles and paradoxes that Mr. Chaplin permits himself." Gene Arneel of Variety wrote, "As the focal character on the screen, Chaplin is, at times, magnificent. He has departed from the baggy-pants but still manages to work in some sock pantomime stuff. However, the role he gave himself calls for too much talk, and some of this grows tedious." Harrison's Reports called it "an excellent human drama ... Chaplin does an outstanding job in every department, thus proving his genius. The one criticism that may be made is its excessive length; in some of the scenes Chaplin indulges in too much talk, preaching and moralizing in what impresses one as an attempt to get over his personal philosophy on life in general." Richard L. Coe of The Washington Post declared, "Mr. Chaplin's gentle picture, over-long and under-disciplined it may be, restates the timeless lesson of human companionship that is the theme of philosophers and preachers. For all its shortcomings, 'Limelight' is a creative, distinguished film." John McCarten of The New Yorker wrote, "Regrettably, Mr. Chaplin isn't as quick as Shakespeare in getting the point across. There are, however, rewarding flashes of the sort of comedy and pathos that distinguished Mr. Chaplin's work in the past, and his portrait of an eminent performer who has fallen out of public favor carries a sad conviction." The Monthly Film Bulletin of Britain wrote that the film "is not perfect; it is perhaps ten minutes too long; there are moments when sentiment slips over into sentimentality. The weaknesses are slight and insignificant. The qualities of Limelight — the affection, the humour, the almost overpowering sadness in the portrayal of Calvero — are unerringly those of the screen's greatest humanist."

While touring Britain to promote the film, Chaplin learned that he had been refused a re-entry visa to the United States because of his alleged communist sympathies, and many American theaters refused to play Limelight. Outside of cinemas in several East Coast cities, the film was not seen by the American moviegoing public. It was not until 1972 that the film was finally seen in wide American release. Limelight currently holds an excellent 96% on Rotten Tomatoes. The film was massively popular in Japan. It was enormously successful in Europe and around the world. However, in the U.S. it was a relative disappointment, only taking in $1 million.

Limelight enjoyed a cumulative worldwide gross of $8 million. Chaplin biographer Jeffrey Vance notes that the film's reputation has slowly grown over the decades. Vance maintains "Limelight is Chaplin's last great film, and it plays like a self-conscious summing up of his life and career. As a journey back to his beginnings and an often rapier-sharp self-critique, Limelight is Chaplin's most deeply personal and introspective film."

Music 

The instrumental theme to the film, composed by Chaplin and titled "The Terry Theme", became a popular and often-covered song as "Eternally", with lyrics by Geoff Parsons and John Turner. In 1973, over 20 years after the film's first release, Chaplin and his musical collaborators Raymond Rasch and Larry Russell were awarded an Oscar for Best Original Dramatic Score. In the case of Larry Russell, JazzWax journalist Marc Myers has written that this was a case of mistaken identity and Russell Garcia was the actual composer who should have been awarded the 1972 Oscar. Larry Russell's family denies the report. Regardless, it was the only competitive Academy Award that Chaplin ever received (he had previously received two Honorary Oscars).

Home media 
In 2000, Limelight was released in the United States on DVD from Image Entertainment, which later went out of print. In 2003, it was released on a special edition two-disc DVD set from Warner Home Video, which also later went out of print. The Criterion Collection released the film on both Blu-ray and DVD in the United States on May 19, 2015. A four-minute scene, featuring Stapleton Kent as an armless violin player, had been cut for the film's worldwide release, but was included in the set as a bonus feature. This scene was also included as an extra on the Image DVD release. The only home video release that contains the full-length uncut American theatrical premiere version with the deleted scene intact is the 1993 laserdisc release on the CBS/Fox Video label, which was prepared by film restorationist David Shepard.

Legacy 
The sixtieth anniversary of Limelight was celebrated by the Academy of Motion Picture Arts and Sciences with a reception, panel, and film screening at their Samuel Goldwyn Theater in Beverly Hills, California, on October 3, 2012. Cast members Claire Bloom and Norman Lloyd shared their recollections in a conversation moderated by Chaplin biographer and archivist Jeffrey Vance.

References

Sources

External links 

 
 
 
 
Limelight: Portrait of the Artist as an Old Man an essay by Peter von Bagh at the Criterion Collection

1952 films
1952 comedy-drama films
Films about ballet
American black-and-white films
Films directed by Charlie Chaplin
Films set in 1914
Films set in London
Films that won the Best Original Score Academy Award
Music published by Bourne Co. Music Publishers
American comedy-drama films
Films about old age
Comedy films about clowns
Films about clowns
1950s English-language films
1950s American films